St. Andrews is a census-designated place (CDP) in Richland County, South Carolina, United States. The population was 20,493 at the 2010 census. It is part of the Columbia, South Carolina Metropolitan Statistical Area.

History
The Pine Grove Rosenwald School was listed on the National Register of Historic Places in 2009.

Geography
St. Andrews is located at  (34.043551, -81.097854).

Demographics

2020 census

As of the 2020 United States census, there were 20,675 people, 9,534 households, and 4,364 families residing in the CDP.

2000 census
As of the census of 2000, there were 21,814 people, 10,497 households, and 5,091 families residing in the CDP. The population density was 3,167.8 people per square mile (1,222.4/km2). There were 11,398 housing units at an average density of 1,655.2 per square mile (638.7/km2). The racial makeup of the CDP was 43.05% White, 52.69% African American, 0.25% Native American, 1.83% Asian, 0.07% Pacific Islander, 0.83% from other races, and 1.27% from two or more races. Hispanic or Latino of any race were 1.98% of the population.

There were 10,497 households, out of which 24.1% had children under the age of 18 living with them, 28.8% were married couples living together, 16.1% had a female householder with no husband present, and 51.5% were non-families. 40.5% of all households were made up of individuals, and 5.6% had someone living alone who was 65 years of age or older. The average household size was 2.07 and the average family size was 2.83.

In the CDP, the population was spread out, with 21.2% under the age of 18, 15.8% from 18 to 24, 36.8% from 25 to 44, 17.6% from 45 to 64, and 8.6% who were 65 years of age or older. The median age was 30 years. For every 100 females, there were 86.3 males. For every 100 females age 18 and over, there were 82.8 males.

The median income for a household in the CDP was $34,551, and the median income for a family was $42,088. Males had a median income of $31,114 versus $25,329 for females. The per capita income for the CDP was $20,201. About 10.5% of families and 13.1% of the population were below the poverty line, including 20.5% of those under age 18 and 6.2% of those age 65 or over.

Education
St. Andrews has a public library, a branch of the Richland County Library.

References

Census-designated places in Richland County, South Carolina
Census-designated places in South Carolina
Columbia metropolitan area (South Carolina)